Kyle Hodsoll (born 24 November 1988) is a Bermudian cricketer. He made his One Day International debut for Bermuda against Kenya at Nairobi in 2007.

In August 2019, he was named in Bermuda's squad for the Regional Finals of the 2018–19 ICC T20 World Cup Americas Qualifier tournament. In November 2019, he was named in Bermuda's squad for the Cricket World Cup Challenge League B tournament in Oman.

In October 2021, he was named in Bermuda's squad for the 2021 ICC Men's T20 World Cup Americas Qualifier tournament in Antigua. On 10 November he played for Bermuda against the Bahamas after an absence of 13 years and 97 days from Twenty20 Internationals, setting a new record for the longest gap between T20I appearances.

References

External links

1988 births
Living people
Bermudian cricketers
Bermuda One Day International cricketers
Bermuda Twenty20 International cricketers